Albertine Van Roy-Moens (13 October 1915 – 21 October 1987) was a Belgian gymnast. She competed in the women's artistic team all-around at the 1948 Summer Olympics.

References

External links
 

1915 births
1987 deaths
Belgian female artistic gymnasts
Olympic gymnasts of Belgium
Gymnasts at the 1948 Summer Olympics
People from Willebroek
Sportspeople from Antwerp Province
20th-century Belgian women